Deyna Cristina Castellanos Naujenis (born 18 April 1999) is a Venezuelan professional footballer who plays as a forward for Women's Super League club Manchester City and the Venezuela women's national team.

Early life 
Deyna Cristina Castellanos Naujenis was born on 18 April 1999 in Maracay, on the Caribbean coast of Venezuela.

Club career
Castellanos was awarded a scholarship to study journalism and play football at Florida State University, an experience she describes as life-changing; she spent three college years with the Florida State Seminoles before signing a two-year contract with the Spanish club, Atlético Madrid on 2 January 2020.

At the end of this contract, Castellanos moved to English club Manchester City, in the Women's Super League (WSL), where she signed a three-year contract on 3 June 2022; she was described as the marquee signing during a high-turnover summer for the club. She made her Manchester City debut on 18 August 2022, in a 6–0 Champions League win against Kazakhstani side Tomaris-Turan, scoring a penalty in the 89th minute. On 18 September 2022, she made her WSL debut, coming on in the 70th minute during a 4–3 defeat by Aston Villa.

International career

Youth
In 2014, she was a member of the Venezuela national under-17 team who finished fourth in the 2014 FIFA U-17 Women's World Cup and runners-up in the 2014 Women's Youth Olympic football. She won the Golden Boot of the 2014 FIFA U-17 Women's World Cup with six goals, equalling her teammate Gabriela García and was also a goalscorer of the 2014 Women's Youth Olympic football with seven. She was also as a top scorer of the 2016 South American Under-17 Women's Football Championship with 12. Castellanos is the top goalscorer of the Venezuela U-17 women's team with 35. Castellanos is currently the all-time leading goalscorer of the FIFA U-17 Women's World Cup with 11.

Castellanos was called up to the Venezuela U-20 women's team in January 2018 for the 2018 South American Under-20 Women's Football Championship. She was the only player to score in the Group B matches with three, once against Uruguay, Bolivia and Chile. She was also the only player to score in the final stage, scoring once in a 3–1 defeat against Paraguay U-20 women's team.

Senior
In April 2018, Castellanos was part of the senior team in the 2018 Copa América Femenina. She scored on her debut against Ecuador on 5 April, and netted four times in an 8–0 win over Bolivia four days later. In 2021, at the age of 21, she was named captain of the team for the first time.

Off the pitch

Castellanos started a foundation that encourages gender equality and helps provide football scholarship for South American girls.

She has worked as a studio analyst for NBC and Telemundo at the 2018 (men's) and 2019 (women's) FIFA World Cups, and in Spain. She is a fan of tattoos and as of 2022 has over 30. In Venezuela, she is known as Reina Deyna ("Queen Deyna"). She learnt English while at university in Florida, becoming quickly bilingual.

In The Best FIFA Football Awards 2017, Castellanos was named to the three woman shortlist for The Best FIFA Women's Player. Her nomination created some controversy. Megan Rapinoe was outspoken about this nomination, complaining that Castellanos was an unknown player and had not played professionally, nor in a major senior national team tournament at the time of her nomination.

Career statistics

Club 
.

International 

Scores and results list Venezuela's goal tally first, score column indicates score after each Castellanos goal.

Honours
Atlético Madrid
Supercopa de España Femenina: 2020–21

References

External links

 Her official site
 Her Soccerway profile
 Her Instagram account
 Her Twitter account

1999 births
Living people
Sportspeople from Maracay
Venezuelan women's footballers
Women's association football forwards
Florida State Seminoles women's soccer players
Atlético Madrid Femenino players
Manchester City W.F.C. players
Venezuela women's international footballers
Venezuelan expatriate women's footballers
Venezuelan expatriate sportspeople in Spain
Venezuelan expatriate sportspeople in the United States
Expatriate women's soccer players in the United States
Expatriate sportspeople in England
Venezuelan expatriate sportspeople in England
Footballers at the 2014 Summer Youth Olympics
Primera División (women) players
Expatriate women's footballers in England
Expatriate women's footballers in Spain